Uttley is a surname. Notable people with the surname include:

Albert Uttley (1906–1985)
Alison Uttley (1884–1976), British writer of over 100 books
Kenneth Uttley (1913–1973), New Zealand cricketer
Linda Uttley (1966–2009), English rugby union footballer 
Matthew Uttley (born 1965), British defence academic 
Roger Uttley OBE MA (born 1949), former English rugby union player
Terry Uttley (1951–2021), bass guitarist, best known as a founding member of the band Smokie

See also
Parsons (Livestock) Ltd v Uttley Ingham & Co Ltd QB 791, an English contract law case concerning remoteness of damage
Utley (disambiguation)